Bart Visman (Naarden, 21 October 1962) is a Dutch composer. Among his works he is well known in the Netherlands for the children's opera De roep van de kinkhoorn to a libretto by the late Dutch children's author Paul Biegel.

References

External links
 Official website

People from Naarden
1962 births
Dutch composers
Living people